Frank B. Hendel (July 23, 1892 – December 1973) was an American politician from New York.

Life
He was born on July 23, 1892, in Middle Village, Queens. He engaged in the real estate and insurance business.

Hendel was a member of the New York State Assembly (Queens Co., 2nd D.) in 1927, 1928, 1929 and 1930.

He was a member of the New York State Senate (3rd D.) from 1931 to 1936, sitting in the 154th, 155th, 156th, 157th, 158th and 159th New York State Legislatures. In September 1936, Hendel was denied a renomination by the Democratic boss of Queens James C. Sheridan. Hendel challenged the party designee Peter T. Farrell in the Democratic primary, but lost.

He died in December 1973.

Sources

External links
 The Frank B. Hendel papers, 1926–1953 at World Cat

1892 births
1973 deaths
Democratic Party New York (state) state senators
People from Middle Village, Queens
Democratic Party members of the New York State Assembly
20th-century American politicians